Ceica is a commune in Bihor County, Crișana, Romania with a population of 3,591 people. It is composed of seven villages: Bucium (Tőkefalva), Ceica, Ceișoara (Cseszvára), Corbești (Hollószeg), Cotiglet (Kótliget), Dușești (Dusafalva) and Incești (Jancsófalva).

References

Ceica
Localities in Crișana